The  is a subway line, part of the Nagoya Municipal Subway system in Nagoya, Japan. The Sakura-dōri Line's color on maps is red. In 2004, the city started to change all station signs. The new signs have a station name followed by a single letter and a number. In the case of Sakura-dōri Line, the letter is S. Officially, the line is called . All the stations accept manaca, a rechargeable contactless smart card.

The first section of the line opened in 1989. Between Nagoya and Imaike, the line runs under Sakura-dōri Avenue, being the bypass line of Higashiyama Line. Until 2015, it was the only Nagoya Municipal Subway line to use Automatic train operation.

All platforms are 8 cars long but only 5 car trains are currently operated.

Stations

Rolling stock
 6000 series
 6050 series

History
The Sakura-dōri Line was first envisioned in the Urban Transportation Council Report No. 14 (1972) as an underground line running from Nakamura Kuyakusho to Imaike, and was intended to relieve the central portion of the Higashiyama Line, which in the late-1970s operated with a crush load capacity of 250% during rush hour.

The line was opened on 10 September 1989 between Nakamura Kuyakusho and Imaike. Automatic train operation (ATO) using a single driver commenced on 16 February 1994, and the line was extended from Imaike to Nonami on 30 March 1994.

From Nonami, the line was extended further east to Tokushige, in Midori-ku, on 27 March 2011. This extension also involved building a new depot near Tokushige Station, which replaced the previous depot located near Nakamura Kuyakusho Station. There is a plan to extend the line even further, somewhere in Toyoake City or Toyota City. There is also a plan to extend the line to opposite direction, from Nakamura Kuyakusho to somewhere in Ama.

See also
List of railway lines in Japan

References

External links 
 Nagoya Bureau of Transportation (official) 
 Nagoya Bureau of Transportation (official) 
 Subway map

Nagoya Municipal Subway
1067 mm gauge railways in Japan
Railway lines opened in 1989
1989 establishments in Japan